Clover Bend is an unincorporated community in Lawrence County, Arkansas, United States. It is the location of two historic sites listed on the U.S. National Register of Historic Places: the Clover Bend High School, on Arkansas Highway 228 (AR 228), and the Clover Bend Historic District, at the junction of AR 228 and Co. Rd. 1220.

References

Unincorporated communities in Lawrence County, Arkansas
Unincorporated communities in Arkansas